Borgocarbonara is a comune (municipality) in the province of Mantua, Lombardy, northern Italy. It was formed on 1 January 2019 by the merger of the previous comuni of Borgofranco sul Po and Carbonara di Po.

References

Cities and towns in Lombardy